Gemiluth Chessed (Acts of Loving Kindness) is a Moorish Revival synagogue in Port Gibson, Mississippi.  It is the oldest surviving synagogue in the state and the only building of this architectural style. It was built in 1892 by a community of Jewish immigrants from German states and Alsace-Lorraine. Due to declining population as people moved to larger urban areas, the congregation closed in 1986.

History
The Port Gibson Jewish community was established in the 1840s by Ashkenazi immigrants from the German states and Alsace-Lorraine. Working first as peddlers, they founded the Port Gibson Jewish cemetery in 1870 and built the synagogue in 1892 on Church Street. It is the oldest surviving synagogue in the state and the only building of this architectural style. There were about 50-60 Jewish families during the peak of population at the beginning of the twentieth century.  By then most of the men worked as merchants and cotton brokers.

With the decline of the Mississippi River towns in the later twentieth century, the Jewish community dwindled as the next generations moved to larger cities. The congregation closed in 1986. They donated their Torah and artifacts to the Museum of the Southern Jewish Experience in Utica, Mississippi.  A non-Jewish couple bought the synagogue to ensure its preservation, when it was threatened with demolition for other development.

Description
The exterior features the unusual combination of a Moorish-style keyhole doorway surmounted by a Russian-style dome.  The windows in the turret supporting the dome are also in Moorish keyhole style.  The windows on the brick main floor of the building appear from the exterior as simple arched windows.

Based on the interior, the intentions are obvious that the congregation wanted to build a synagogue in the fashionable Moorish Revival style: the colored glass takes the form of Moorish keyhole windows set into arched, masonry window openings, a thrifty solution that gives the effect of Moorish windows without the expense of fancy brickwork.  The handsome horseshoe arch of the niche for the aron kodesh is especially graceful.

Illustrations

"History of Gemiluth Chassed", Institute of Southern Jewish Life
Gordon, American Jewish History

References

Alsatian-Jewish culture in the United States
National Register of Historic Places in Claiborne County, Mississippi
French-American culture in Mississippi
German-American culture in Mississippi
German-Jewish culture in the United States
Moorish Revival architecture in Mississippi
Moorish Revival synagogues
Synagogues completed in 1892
Synagogues in Mississippi